Tyler Airport may refer to:
Tyler Pounds Regional Airport, serving Tyler, Texas
Tyler Municipal Airport, serving Tyler, Minnesota
Jerry Tyler Memorial Airport, serving Niles, Michigan